Andrew McCartney was a Scottish amateur footballer who in the Scottish League for Queen's Park, Cowdenbeath and Partick Thistle as a centre half. He was capped by Scotland at amateur level.

References 

Scottish footballers
Queen's Park F.C. players
Scottish Football League players
Scotland amateur international footballers
Year of birth missing
Year of death missing
Association football wing halves
Place of death missing
Cowdenbeath F.C. players
Partick Thistle F.C. players
Edinburgh City F.C. (1928) players
Footballers from Glasgow